Dohrniphora is a genus of scuttle flies (insects in the family Phoridae). There are at least 240 described species in Dohrniphora.

See also
 List of Dohrniphora species

References

Further reading

External links

 

Phoridae
Articles created by Qbugbot
Platypezoidea genera